Gordon Williams (born 22 February 1929, died 2002) was an English footballer who played as a centre forward in the Football League for Sheffield United and Darlington. He made five league appearances for each club and scored once, for Darlington, on 4 November 1950 in a 3–2 home win against Scunthorpe United in the Third Division North.

References

1929 births
2002 deaths
Footballers from Newcastle upon Tyne
English footballers
Association football forwards
Sheffield United F.C. players
Darlington F.C. players
English Football League players